Audio-Visions is the seventh studio album by American progressive rock band Kansas, released in 1980. The album was reissued in remastered format on CD in 1996 on Legacy/Epic and again in 2011, as a Japanese import vinyl-replica CD, as well as part of the Sony/Legacy domestic boxed set, Kansas Complete Album Collection 1974-1983, which packages all of the band's original releases on Kirshner and affiliated labels CBS/Columbia.

Kerry Livgren's recent conversion to Christianity is first heard on this album, primarily in the lyrics to "Hold On", which was written as an evangelistic plea to his wife. That song was the original lineup's last Top 40, peaking at No. 40 as the album's first single. The second single from the album, "Got to Rock On," charted outside the Top 40, and was released as a promo only 12" single as well, featuring a live version of the song on Side B of the promotional single, taken from an ABC Radio "the Source" live concert broadcast from Chicago. In addition, another stop on the Audio-Visions tour was broadcast on the radio show "A Night on the Road", from the Palladium in New York City. In addition to playing almost every song on the album on the tour, the band also played one selection each from Livgren and Walsh's recent solo albums. While every song from the album Monolith was played during the early part of the Monolith tour in 1979, not a single song from Monolith was played on the Audio-Visions tour.

The eighth song on this album, "No One Together", was originally intended for release on the previous album, Monolith, but it was dropped from that album due to an argument between Walsh and Livgren over whose song should be included there (with Walsh winning out the argument by having his song, "How My Soul Cries Out for You", included) and wound up on this album instead.

The album was to be the last album with the band's original lineup until 2000's Somewhere to Elsewhere, and coincidentally the band's latest studio album to be certified gold by the RIAA (which it did in December 1980).

In 2018, Friday Music released a 180-gram "blue-splatter" translucent vinyl remaster of the album, featuring a gatefold cover with the original sleeve artwork, and an insert in the first sleeve of a foldout poster of the album cover.

Reception

Rolling Stone gave a resoundingly negative review of the album, calling it "the musically overwrought and lyrically fatuous product of a collective hubris gone haywire," and mockingly referring to Kerry Livgren as "Kerry Liver." They contended that Kansas had lost all direction, with "Hold On" being the only track not lost in misdirected ambitions. 
AllMusic's William Ruhlmann retrospectively remarked how "nothing here matched the music from the group's late-'70s heyday", probably due to the two main songwriters being distracted by their solo careers with Kansas "becoming a part-time occupation".

Record World said the single Got to Rock On" has "a thunderous, driving beat and dynamic tempo shifts."

Track listing

Credits 

Kansas
 Steve Walsh - keyboards, vibraphone, percussion, lead and backing vocals
 Kerry Livgren - guitars, keyboards, percussion, backing vocals
 Robby Steinhardt - violin, viola, lead and backing vocals
 Rich Williams - guitar, percussion, backing vocals
 Dave Hope - bass guitar, backing vocals
 Phil Ehart - drums, percussion, backing vocals

Additional personnel
 Donna Williams – additional voice and sounds
 Joey Jelf – additional voice and sounds
 Lisa White – additional voice and sounds
 Victoria Livgren – additional voice and sounds
 Terry Ehart – additional voice and sounds
 The Four Bassmen – additional voice and sounds

Production
 Kansas - producers, cover concept
 Brad Aaron, Davey Moiré - co-producers, engineers
 Greg Webster - assistant engineer
 George Marino - mastering at Sterling Sound, New York
 Tom Drennon - art direction, design, illustrations
 Peter Lloyd - cover painting
 Bob Irwin - reissue producer
 Vic Anesini - digital remastering
 Frank Tozour - sony digital editing

Charts 
 

Album

Singles

Certifications

References

Kansas (band) albums
1980 albums
Epic Records albums